(Latin for "You will draw waters") is a landmark encyclical of Pope Pius XII on devotion to the Sacred Heart of Jesus. Written on May 15, 1956, it was attached to the 100th anniversary of the establishment of the feast of the Sacred Heart of Jesus by Pope Pius IX.

The title is derived from Isaiah 12:3.

Sacred Heart of Jesus 

Pius XII gave two reasons why the Church gives the highest form of worship to the Heart of Jesus. The first rests on the principle whereby the believers recognise that Jesus' Heart is hypostatically united to the "Person of the Incarnate Son of God Himself". The second reason is derived from the fact that the Heart is the natural sign and symbol of Jesus' boundless love for humanity. The encyclical recalls that for human souls the wound in Christ's side and the marks left by the nails have been "the chief sign and symbol of that love" that ever more incisively shaped their life from within.

The Pope describes several erroneous opinions regarding this devotion: that there are those who consider it burdensome and of little or no use to men; others who consider this devotion as a  piety suited for women, and not  for educated men; and those who consider a devotion of this kind as primarily demanding penance, expiation and the other virtues which they call "passive," meaning thereby that they produce no external results. Hence they do not think it suitable to re-enkindle the spirit of piety in modern times. The encyclical replies with Pope Pius XI: "The veneration of the Sacred Heart is a summary of all our religion and, moreover, a guide to a more perfect life. It more easily leads our minds to know Christ the Lord intimately and more effectively turns our hearts to love Him more ardently and to imitate Him more perfectly."  opines that the Sacred Heart never ceased, and never will cease, to beat with calm. It will never cease to symbolize the threefold love with which Jesus Christ is bound to his heavenly Father and the entire human race.

The Heart of Jesus Christ loves the human race but as a human and divine heart. It began to beat with love at once human and divine after the Virgin Mary generously pronounced her "Fiat".  The Sacred Heart of Jesus shares in a most intimate way in the life of the Incarnate Word, and is thus a kind of instrument of the Divinity. Therefore, "in the carrying out of works of grace and divine omnipotence, His Heart, no less than the other members of His human nature is a symbol of that unbounded love".

Excerpts

Later Popes 

In a letter on May 15, 2006 Benedict XVI wrote: "By encouraging devotion to the Heart of Jesus, the Encyclical  exhorted believers to open themselves to the mystery of God and of his love and to allow themselves to be transformed by it. After 50 years, it is still a fitting task for Christians to continue to deepen their relationship with the Heart of Jesus, in such a way as to revive their faith in the saving love of God and to welcome him ever better into their lives." As the latter states, "we must draw from this source to attain true knowledge of Jesus Christ and a deeper experience of his love".

See also

 
 
 Mary of the Divine Heart
 Act of Consecration to the Sacred Heart of Jesus
 Alliance of the Hearts of Jesus and Mary

References

External links
Encyclical Haurietis aquas of Pope Pius XII on the Vatican Website
Letter of Pope Benedict XVI on the 50th anniversary of Haurietis aquas

Encyclicals of Pope Pius XII
Catholic devotions
1956 documents
1956 in Christianity
May 1956 events